is an apostolic constitution in the form of a papal bull promulgated by Pope Alexander VII in 1656 which judged the meaning and intention of Cornelius Jansen's words in Augustinus, and confirmed and renewed the condemnation in  promulgated by Pope Innocent X in 1653 that five propositions found in Augustinus were heretical.

That same year, 1656, sixty Jansenist doctors, including Antoine Arnauld, were degraded from the College of Sorbonne faculty of theology. French bishops supported Alexander VII.

Michael O'Riordan wrote, in Catholic Encyclopedia, that since some still insisted that those propositions were not to be found in Augustinus, or were not meant by Jansen in the sense in which they were condemned,  furthermore declared that they are contained in Augustinus, and have been condemned according to the sense of the author.

See also
Formulary controversy
Jansenism

References

Apostolic constitutions
Documents of Pope Alexander VII
Jansenism
Latin texts
Religion in the Ancien Régime
1656 in Christianity
1656 works
17th-century papal bulls